Russian Academy of Arts (RAA / rus. РАХ, Росси́йская акаде́мия худо́жеств) is the State scientific Institution of Russian Federation, eligible heir to the USSR Academy of Arts. The Academy is a heir to traditions of the Imperial Academy of Arts established in 1757 to promote the development of Russian art.  RAA is the public cultural Institution—a counterpart of the Russian Academy of Sciences in the field of fine arts, architecture, decorations, design and art education. A founder of RAA is the Government of the Russian Federation.

Academic system of art education
Art education is one of the main aspects of the Russian Academy of Arts activity. In order to facilitate the development of art school creativity, Art Academy works on its scientific and methodological management.

Membership
Members of the Russian Academy of Arts include Full Members, Corresponding Members, Honorary Members and Foreign Members.

The Government of Russia determines the number of members and the Academy Assembly has the right to elect them.

Artists, architects, designers and art critics can be elected for their enhancement of fine arts, architecture, design and art criticism with distinguished and important works of art and research work. Membership lasts lifelong.

Elections should be held at least once in 3 years.

References

External links
 Official site

 
Academies of arts
 
Russian National Academies
European Academy of Sciences and Arts
 
 
 
 
1757 establishments in the Russian Empire